Stryi urban territorial hromada is an urban hromada (municipality) of Ukraine, located in the western Lviv Oblast. Its administrative centre is the city of Stryi.

Its population is 

Until 18 July 2020, Stryi was incorporated as a city of oblast significance and served as the administrative center of Stryi Raion even though it did not belong to the raion. In July 2020, as part of the administrative reform of Ukraine, which reduced the number of raions of Lviv Oblast to seven, the city of Stryi was merged into Stryi Raion.

Settlements 
In addition to one city (Stryi) and one urban-type settlement (Dashava), Stryi urban hromada includes 45 villages:
 
 
 
 
 
 
 Holobutiv
 
 
 Dobriany
 
 Zavadiv
 
 
 
 
 Kavske
 
 
 
 
 Lysiatychi
 
 
 
 
 Nezhukhiv
 
 
 
 
 
 
 
 
 
 
 
 
 
 Uhersko

References 

2020 establishments in Ukraine
Hromadas of Lviv Oblast